Woman of the World is a song by American hard rock band, Aerosmith on their second album, Get Your Wings. "Woman of the World" was written by Steven Tyler and former Chain Reaction band-mate, Don Solomon.

In performance
The song was performed constantly during the mid-seventies. The B-Side to the song is "Spaced." The first time it was played was on April 7, 1974 at the Michigan Palace in Detroit. On July 26, 2012 in Atlanta, they performed the first verse of the song,.

References

Aerosmith songs
1974 songs
Songs written by Steven Tyler
Song recordings produced by Jack Douglas (record producer)